Kangite is an exceedingly rare scandium mineral, a natural form of impure scandium oxide ), with the formula . It crystallizes in the cubic crystal system diploidal class. In terms of chemistry it scandium-analogue of tistarite. Both kangite and tistarite were discovered in the Allende meteorite.

References

Oxide minerals
Scandium minerals
Cubic minerals